The Coasters are an American rhythm and blues/rock and roll vocal group who had a string of hits in the late 1950s. Beginning with "Searchin'" and "Young Blood" in 1957, their most memorable songs were written by the songwriting and producing team of Leiber and Stoller. Although the Coasters originated outside of mainstream doo-wop, their records were so frequently imitated that they became an important part of the doo-wop legacy through the 1960s.   In 1987, they were the first group inducted into the Rock and Roll Hall of Fame.

History
The Coasters were formed on October 12, 1955, when two of The Robins, a Los Angeles–based rhythm-and-blues group, joined Atlantic Records. They were dubbed The Coasters because they went from the west coast to the east. The Robins included Carl Gardner and Bobby Nunn. The original Coasters were Gardner, Nunn, Billy Guy, Leon Hughes (who was replaced by Young Jessie on a couple of their early Los Angeles recordings), and the guitarist Adolph Jacobs. Jacobs left the group in 1959.

The songwriting team of Jerry Leiber and Mike Stoller started Spark Records and in 1955 produced "Smokey Joe's Cafe" for the Robins (their sixth single with Leiber and Stoller). The record was popular enough for Atlantic Records to offer Leiber and Stoller an independent production contract to produce the Robins for Atlantic. Only two of the Robins—Gardner and Nunn—were willing to make the move to Atlantic, recording their first songs in the same studio as the Robins had done (Master Recorders). In late 1957, Nunn and Hughes moved to New York and joined with Cornell Gunter and Will "Dub" Jones to form The Coasters. The new quartet was from then on stationed in New York, although all had Los Angeles roots.

The Coasters' association with Leiber and Stoller was an immediate success. Together they created a string of good-humored "storytelling" hits that are some of the most entertaining from the original era of rock and roll. According to Leiber and Stoller, getting the humor to come through on the records often required more recording "takes" than for a typical musical number.

Their first single, "Down in Mexico", was an R&B hit in 1956. The following year, the Coasters crossed over to the pop chart in a big way with the double-sided "Young Blood"/"Searchin'". "Searchin'" was the group's first U.S. Top 10 hit, and topped the R&B chart for 13 weeks, becoming the biggest R&B single of 1957 (all were recorded in Los Angeles).

"Yakety Yak" (recorded in New York), featuring King Curtis on tenor saxophone, included the famous lineup of Gardner, Guy, Jones, and Gunter, and became the act's only national number one single, topping both the pop and R&B charts. The next single, "Charlie Brown", reached number two on both charts. It was followed by "Along Came Jones", "Poison Ivy" (number 1 for almost two months on the R&B chart), and "Little Egypt (Ying-Yang)".

Changing popular tastes and changes in the group's line-up contributed to a lack of hits in the 1960s. During this time, Billy Guy was also working on solo projects; the New York singer Vernon Harrell was brought in to replace him for stage performances. Later members included Earl "Speedo" Carroll (lead of the Cadillacs), Ronnie Bright (the bass voice on Johnny Cymbal's "Mr. Bass Man"), Jimmy Norman, and guitarist Thomas "Curley" Palmer. The Coasters signed with Columbia Records' Date label in 1966, reuniting with Leiber and Stoller (who had parted ways with Atlantic Records in 1963), but never regained their former fame. In 1971, the Coasters had a minor chart entry with "Love Potion No. 9", a song that Leiber and Stoller had written for the Coasters, but instead gave to the Clovers in 1959. In Britain, a 1994 Volkswagen TV advertisement used the group's "Sorry But I'm Gonna Have to Pass", which led to a minor chart placement in that country.

In 1987, the Coasters became the first group inducted into the Rock and Roll Hall of Fame, crediting the members of the 1958 configuration. The Coasters also joined the Vocal Group Hall of Fame in 1999.

Several groups used the name in the 1970s, touring throughout the country, though original member Carl Gardner held the legal rights to it. Gardner continued to tour with the Coasters and made many attempts to stop bogus groups with no connection to the original group using the name. In late 2005, Carl's son Carl Gardner Jr. took over as lead with the group when his father retired. The Coasters' line-up then consisted of Carl Gardner Jr., J. W. Lance, Primo Candelara, and Eddie Whitfield. Carl Jr. later left this group and has started his own group with Curley Palmer. Carl's widow Veta owns the rights to the Coasters name.

Leon Hughes is the last surviving member of the original Coasters and performs with his own group. Some of the former members suffered tragic ends. The saxophonist King Curtis (the "fifth Coaster") was stabbed to death by two junkies outside his apartment building in 1971. Cornelius Gunter was shot to death while sitting in a Las Vegas parking garage in 1990. Nate Wilson, a member of one of Gunter's offshoot Coasters groups, was shot and his body dismembered in 1980.

Former manager Patrick Cavanaugh was convicted of the murder, which took place after Wilson threatened to notify authorities of Cavanaugh's intent to buy furniture with stolen checks. Cavanaugh was convicted of the murder and given the death sentence in 1984, but his sentence was commuted to life in prison. He died at 60 in 2006, in Ely State Prison, in Nevada.

Group members
 Current members
 J. W. Lance – lead vocals, previously tenor vocals (July 2001–present)
 Primotivo Candelaria – tenor  vocals (October 2008–present)
 Robert Fowler – bass vocals (January 2015 – present)
 Dennis Anderson – baritone  vocals (June 2011–present)

 Former members
(Rock 'n' Roll Hall of Fame inductees listed in bold.)

 Carl Gardner – lead vocals (1955–2005)
 Billy Guy – baritone vocals (1955–1973)
 Bobby Nunn – bass vocals (1955–1957)
 Leon Hughes – tenor vocals (1955–1957)
 Adolph Jacobs – guitar (1956–1959/1960)
 Young Jessie – tenor vocals (1957; substitute)
 Will "Dub" Jones – bass vocals (1958–1967)
 Cornell Gunter – tenor vocals (1958–1961)
 Albert "Sonny" Forriest – guitar (1959–1961)
 Earl "Speedo" Carroll – tenor vocals (1961–1979)
 Thomas "Curley" Palmer – guitar (1962–2011)
 Vernon Harrell – baritone vocals (1965–1967; substitute)
 Ronnie Bright – bass vocals (1968–2009)
 Jimmy Norman – baritone vocals (substitute 1969–1972; member 1973–1978, 1980–1997)
 Alvin Morse – baritone vocals (1997–2008)
 Carl Gardner, Jr. – tenor vocals (1997–2001 and 2004), lead and baritone vocals (2005–2011)
 Eddie Whitfield - bass vocals (November 2009-December 2015)

Discography

Studio albums
 1960: The Coasters One by OneAtco LP 33-123 (SD33-123 stereo)
 1972: On BroadwayKing K-1146-498 (KS-1146-498 stereo)

Compilation albums
 1957: The CoastersAtco LP 33-101
 1959: The Coasters' Greatest HitsAtco LP 33-111 (SD33-111 rechanneled stereo 1960)
 1962: Coast Along with the CoastersAtco LP 33-135 (SD33-135 alternate stereo edition)
 1965: That Is Rock & RollClarion LP 605 (SD-605 stereo)
 1971: Their Greatest Recordings: The Early YearsAtco LP SD33-371 (stereo compilation with alternates)

Charting singles
The Coasters recorded many songs that were released as two-song record singles and several appeared in the charts, including Billboard's Hot 100 and Hot R&B singles charts and the UK Singles Chart.

Billboard Year-End performances

References

Bibliography
 Carl Gardner – Yakety Yak I Fought Back - My Life with The Coasters (Veta Gardner, AuthorHouse, 2007)
 Bill Millar – The Coasters (Star Books, 1974)

External links
 
 

American rhythm and blues musical groups
Doo-wop groups
Rock music groups from California
African-American musical groups
Atlantic Records artists
Atco Records artists
Musical groups from Los Angeles
Rock and roll music groups
1955 establishments in California
Musical groups established in 1955